Göyəlli (also, Göyəli, Geyali, and Geyalli) is a village and municipality in the Gadabay Rayon of Azerbaijan.  It has a population of 1,393.

Notable natives 

 Aytakin Mammadov — National Hero of Azerbaijan.

References 

Populated places in Gadabay District